Marmaduke Lumley (died 1450) was an English priest, Bishop of Carlisle from 1429 to 1450, and Knight Commander of the Order of St. John of Jerusalem. He was a son of Ralph de Lumley, 1st Baron Lumley and Eleanor de Neville. He was elected about 5 December 1429, and consecrated on 16 April 1430. He was Bishop of Lincoln for a short time before his death in December 1450. He was educated at University of Cambridge and was appointed Precentor of Lincoln Cathedral in 1425. He also became Chancellor of the University of Cambridge in 1427 and was Master of Trinity Hall, Cambridge from 1429 to 1443. From 1446 to 1449 he served as Lord High Treasurer of England. Lumley's tenure as Lord High Treasurer occurred during the Great Bullion Famine and the Great Slump in England.

His administrator was a clerk of Lichfield, John Whelpdale.

Citations

References
 
 Milner, E. (1904). Records of the Lumleys of Lumley Castle. Edith Benham, ed. London: George Bell & Sons. Google Books.

Year of birth missing
1450 deaths
Masters of Trinity Hall, Cambridge
Chancellors of the University of Cambridge
Bishops of Carlisle
Bishops of Lincoln
Lord High Treasurers of England
15th-century English Roman Catholic bishops